Idalus luteorosea is a moth of the family Erebidae. It was described by Walter Rothschild in 1909. It is found in French Guiana, Guyana and Venezuela.

References

 

luteorosea
Moths described in 1909